João Victor Gomes da Silva (born 12 February 2001) is a Brazilian professional footballer who plays as a midfielder for Premier League club Wolverhampton Wanderers.

Career

Flamengo
After figuring on the bench on the 16 October 2020, João Gomes made his debut on the 1 November 2020, starting for Flamengo in the Série A 4–1 home defeat against São Paulo.

Wolverhampton Wanderers
On 30 January 2023, João Gomes signed for Wolverhampton Wanderers in the Premier League for €18.7m, after a drawn out battle between Wolves and Ligue 1 club Olympique Lyonnais for his signature.

Gomes scored the winning goal in a 2–1 comeback victory for Wolves at Southampton in the Premier League on his debut appearance for the club (as a second-half substitute) on 11 February 2023 — this despite Wolves being reduced to ten men after a Mario Lemina red card in the first half.

Career statistics

Club

Honours

Club
Flamengo
Copa Libertadores: 2022
Campeonato Brasileiro Série A: 2020
Copa do Brasil: 2022
Supercopa do Brasil: 2021
Campeonato Carioca: 2020, 2021

Individual
Campeonato Brasileiro Série A Team of the Year: 2022

References

External links
Profile at the Wolverhampton Wanderers F.C. website

2001 births
Living people
Brazilian footballers
Footballers from Rio de Janeiro (city)
Association football midfielders
CR Flamengo footballers
Wolverhampton Wanderers F.C. players
Campeonato Brasileiro Série A players
Premier League players
Copa Libertadores-winning players
Brazilian expatriate footballers
Expatriate footballers in England
Brazilian expatriate sportspeople in England